Mount Jenkins is a mountain,  high, standing  northeast of Mount Edward in the Sweeney Mountains of Palmer Land, Antarctica. It was discovered and photographed by the Ronne Antarctic Research Expedition, 1947–48, was mapped by the United States Geological Survey from surveys and U.S. Navy air photos, 1961–67, and was named by the Advisory Committee on Antarctic Names for W.H. Jenkins, a hospital corpsman at South Pole Station, winter party 1963.

References

Mountains of Palmer Land